Al-Dhaibah is a sub-district located in Suwayr District, 'Amran Governorate, Yemen. Al-Dhaibah had a population of 2192 according to the 2004 census.

References 

Sub-districts in Suwayr District